World Famous Classics: 1993–1998 is the first of three greatest hits albums by hip hop group The Beatnuts. It was released by Sony BMG in 1999 two weeks after the release of The Beatnuts' most commercially successful album, A Musical Massacre. It contains songs from The Beatnuts' first three albums, as well as its two EPs. The album does not feature any exclusive songs. World Famous Classics did not chart upon release, and is currently out of print.

Track listing

References

The Beatnuts albums
1999 greatest hits albums